Ipomoea morning glories are used as food plants by the larvae of a number of Lepidoptera species, including:

Monophagous
Species which feed exclusively on Ipomoea

Bedelliidae
 Bedellia minor
 Bedellia terenodes
Bucculatricidae
 Bucculatrix univoca – recorded on water spinach (I. aquatica)
Noctuidae
Schinia simplex – recorded on bush morning glory (I. leptophylla)

Polyphagous
Species which feed on Ipomoea and other plants

Arctiidae
 Hypercompe eridanus
 Hypercompe icasia
Bedelliidae
 Bedellia orchilella (Hawaiian sweet potato leaf miner) – recorded on sweet potato (I. batatas), I. tuberculata, probably others
 Bedellia somnulentella (sweet potato leaf miner) – recorded on sweet potato (I. batatas), common morning glory (I. purpurea), possibly others
Bucculatricidae
 Bucculatrix ruficoma – recorded on sweet potato (I. batatas)
Crambidae
 Omphisa anastomosalis (sweet potato vine borer) – recorded on sweet potato (I. batatas), probably others
Geometridae
 Gymnoscelis rufifasciata (double-striped pug) – recorded on sweet potato (I. batatas), probably others
Hepialidae
 Trichophassus giganteus
Nymphalidae
 Danaus chrysippus (plain tiger) – recorded on moon vine (I. alba), I. bona-nox, possibly others
 Junonia orithya (blue pansy) – recorded on sweet potato (I. batatas), possibly others
Noctuidae
Spodoptera spp. (armyworms) – recorded on little violet morning glory (I. cordatotriloba), ivy-leaved morning glory (I. hederacea) and others

External links

Ipomoea
+Lepidoptera